Solidarity was a small libertarian socialist organisation from 1960 to 1992 in the United Kingdom. It published a magazine of the same name. Solidarity was close to council communism in its prescriptions and was known for its emphasis on workers' self-organisation and for its radical anti-Leninism.

History
Solidarity was founded in 1960 by a small group of expelled members of the Trotskyist Socialist Labour League. It was initially known as Socialism Reaffirmed.  The group published a journal, Agitator, which after six issues was renamed Solidarity, from which the organisation took its new name. Almost from the start it was strongly influenced by the French Socialisme ou Barbarie group, in particular by its intellectual leader Cornelius Castoriadis, whose essays were among the many pamphlets Solidarity produced.

The group was never large, but its magazine and pamphlets were widely read, and group members played a major part in several crucial industrial disputes and many radical campaigns, from the Committee of 100 in the early-1960s peace movement to the Polish Solidarity Campaign of the early 1980s. In the mid-1970s, a number of Solidarity's members left to form the left communist group, the Communist Workers' Organisation.

Solidarity existed as a nationwide organisation with groups in London and many other cities until 1981, when it imploded after a series of political disputes. Solidarity the magazine continued to be published by the London group until 1992; other former Solidarity members were behind Wildcat in Manchester and Here and Now magazine in Glasgow.

The intellectual leader of the group was Chris Pallis, whose pamphlets  (written under the name Maurice Brinton) included Paris May 1968, The Bolsheviks and Workers' Control 1917-21 and 'The Irrational in Politics'. Other key Solidarity writers were Andy Anderson  (author of Hungary 1956), Ken Weller (who wrote several pamphlets on industrial struggles and oversaw the group's Motor Bulletins on the car industry), Joe Jacobs (Out of the Ghetto), John Quail (The Slow-Burning Fuse), Phil Mailer (Portugal:The Impossible Revolution) John King (The Political Economy of Marx, A History of Marxian Economics), George Williamson (writing as James Finlayson, Urban Devastation -  The Planning of Incarceration), David Lamb (Mutinies) and Liz Willis (Women in the Spanish Revolution).

Ideology
Membership of Solidarity was open to anyone who agreed with the statement As We See It, later elaborated in As We Don't See It, some key points of which were:

Solidarity rejected what it saw as the economic determinism and elitism of most of the Marxist left and committed itself to a view of socialism based on self-management. Supporting those who were in conflict with bureaucratic capitalist society "in industry and elsewhere", the group tried to generalise their experiences to develop a mass revolutionary consciousness, which it believed was essential for a total transformation of society. Crucially, the group did not see itself as another political leadership. On the contrary, it believed that the workers themselves should decide on the objectives of their struggles. Control and organisation should remain firmly in their own hands.

In accordance with this, Solidarity had no confidence in the traditional organisations of the working class, the political parties and the trade unions, which it said had become parts of the bureaucratic capitalist pattern of exploitation. The group stressed that socialism was not just the common ownership and control of the means of production and distribution: it also meant equality, real freedom, reciprocal recognition and a radical transformation in all human relations.

Solidarity argued that what it called the "trad revs", i.e., 'traditional revolutionaries' -- among whom it included social democrats, trade unionists, Communists and Trotskyists—had failed to understand that in modern capitalist societies (in which it included Soviet-type societies) the key class division was between order-givers and order-takers and that self-management was now the only viable socialism.

Practice
In workplace politics, Solidarity took a strong line in defence of shop stewards against trade union bureaucrats (and subsequently argued that too many shop stewards had been co-opted by official trade unionism). The group did not put forward candidates for election to union posts (though many Solidarity members became shop stewards and some became officials). It nevertheless played a significant role in several industrial disputes in the 1960s and 1970s by offering its services to those involved.

But it was always also otherwise engaged. The group played an important part in the direct action wing of the early-1960s peace movement (including the Committee of 100 and Spies for Peace), in local and national agitation on housing policy and in squatting throughout the 1960s and 1970s, in protests and actions against the Greek colonels and other right-wing dictatorships in the same period, in the anti-Vietnam war movement, in support of dissidents in the Soviet Union, eastern Europe and China, and in the feminist movement. In later years, Solidarity members tended to get involved in whatever took their fancy, though there were several concerted interventions, the last of them to help set up the Polish Solidarity Campaign in the early 1980s.

The group's distinctive features in its interventions were its rejection of the leftist fashions both for "respectability" – the bugbear of first-wave CND as it saw it – and for supporting "national liberation struggles" in the third world and, closer to home, Ireland. Solidarity was also anti-Zionist (in Brinton's 1974 essay "The Malaise on the Left" Zionism
is described as "anti-Arab" and "anti-socialist"). Solidarity was corruscating in its criticisms of Leninist organisational practice, of the "lifestyle" left that saw "liberation" in personal terms, and of fellow libertarian socialists who fetishised action for its own sake.

Solidarity consistently privileged first-person participant accounts of activism in its industrial and campaigning politics and was equally consistently critical of the process of grassroots political activity. Time and again the group produced documented case studies of how left orthodoxy had let down workers in struggle or radical campaigns. Critics accused it of sectarianism and argued that it operated – contrary to its professed anti-elitism – as an informal "structureless tyranny" with Pallis/Brinton at the centre of a clique of friends. David Widgery's 1973 survey noted:

Publications
For all Solidarity's engagement in struggle "in industry and elsewhere", its main activity was as a publications group. It produced regular magazines from 1960 to 1992. Agitator (1960–61), which became Solidarity for Workers' Power (1961–1977), was published by the London Solidarity group; there were also various short-lived Solidarity magazines published outside London, including the north-west and Glasgow. Solidarity for Self-Management (1977–78) and Solidarity for Social Revolution (1978–81) were both magazines of the national group. The final manifestation of the magazine, called simply Solidarity (1982–92), was published by the London group.

The group also specialised in pamphlets, of which it produced more than 60. Many of them were texts by Cornelius Castoriadis from Socialisme ou Barbarie, published under Castoriadis's pen-name, Paul Cardan, among them Modern Capitalism and Revolution, From Bolshevism to the Bureaucracy, Redefining Revolution, The Meaning of Socialism and Workers' Councils and the Economics of a Self-Managed Society. Other pamphlets include: Solidarity's platforms, As We See It and As We Don't See It; Maurice Brinton's The Bolsheviks and Workers' Control 1917-21, Paris, May 1968 and The Irrational in Politics; and Andy Anderson's Hungary 1956. Solidarity also reprinted many pamphlets associated with the Workers' Opposition in Russia, such as Ida Mett's The Kronstadt Commune and Alexandra Kollontai's The Workers' Opposition.  Many of the pamphlets are accessible online.

Bibliography
Former members of Solidarity are contributing accounts of their experiences with the group to John Quail, who is writing a history. Louis Robertson (the pen-name of a Solidarity member of the late 1970s from the Midlands, who joined the group with a handful of other fellow former dissident members of the Socialist Party of Great Britain) has published an account on the web of his time in Solidarity. He says:

Robertson also describes the group as he first encountered it in the early 1970s:

He continues on the mid-1970s:

In fact there were two London groups: the original North London group and a West London group that focused on industrial agitation in West London.

Robertson goes on to describe how Solidarity played midwife to various minor left-wing groups, among them the left-communist groups World Revolution and the Communist Workers' Organisation. He concludes:

Notes

Further reading
 Brinton, Maurice (ed Goodway, David). For Workers' Power. AK Press. 2004. 
 Goodway, David. Anarchist Seeds Beneath the Snow.  Liverpool University Press, (2006).  .
 Castoriadis, Cornelius (ed Curtis, David Ames). Political and Social Writings (three vols).  University of Minnesota Press. 1988..
 Widgery, David. The Left in Britain, 1956-68. Penguin. 1976.

External links
The Working Class Movement Library's Solidarity (UK) holdings
The North-West Anarchist Federation's online archive of Solidarity pamphlets
Agora International, a massive Castoriadis website
Libertarian Communist Library - Solidarity archive
"Cornelius Castoriadis, 1922-1997" John Barker Biography of C. Castoriadis (with some hints to the Solidarity-Group)

Defunct socialist parties in the United Kingdom
Libertarian socialist parties
Magazines established in 1960
Magazines disestablished in 1992
Political parties established in 1960
Political parties disestablished in 1992
1960 establishments in the United Kingdom
1992 disestablishments in the United Kingdom